The Trollheim Tunnel is a proposed road tunnel which would run  from Ålvundeid to Todal, connecting Sunndal and Surnadal. The tunnel would be built as a toll road, and make it possible to close the Kvanne–Rykkjem Ferry. As of 2009, the estimated cost of the project was 925 million Norwegian krone, which would have to be partially financed by Møre og Romsdal County Municipality. The county council has prioritized the project second after the Nordøy Fixed Link. Construction may start as early as 2013.

References

Road tunnels in Møre og Romsdal
Proposed tunnels in Norway
Sunndal
Surnadal
Proposed road tunnels in Europe